The Islamic Education Institute of Texas (IEIT), also known as Darul Arqam Islamic School District (DAISD) and  Darul Arqam Schools is a network of Islamic schools in Greater Houston, Texas, United States. The organization is a subsidiary of the Islamic Society of Greater Houston (ISGH). IEIT is headquartered in Southwest Management District (formerly Greater Sharpstown) in Houston.

IEIT, as Darul Arqam, began as a full-time PreK-3 school located in two mobile homes in 1992, with 33 students and 8 faculty members. In 2004 it had over 300 students total. It is a PreK-12 school system.

Campuses

Each of the six campuses is located at a particular ISGH mosque:
 Darul Arqam School North (unincorporated Harris County) - Located at Masjid Bilal (Adel Road Islamic Center), it opened in 1992 and serves grades PreK-12. In 2004 it had 175 students, with 19 in senior high school.  it has more than 300 students.
 Darl Arqam School Southeast Campus (Houston) - Located at Masjid Abu-Bakr (Highway 3 Islamic Center), it opened in 1992 and serves early childhood to grade 3.
 Everest Academy (a.k.a. Darul Arqam School South) (Stafford) Located at Masjid Al-Sabireen (Brand Lane Islamic Center), it opened in 2005 and serves grades PreK-8.
 Darul Arqam Southwest (Alief, Houston, near Sugar Land) - Located at Masjid At-Taqwa (Synott Islamic Center), it opened in 1993 and serves early childhood through grade 8.
 ILM Academy (Houston) - Located at the Spring Branch Islamic Center, it opened in 2006 and serves early childhood through grade 8.
 Houston Peace Academy (HPA) (unincorporated Harris County) - Located at Masjid Al-Salam (Champions Islamic Center), which has a Spring mailing address, it opened in 2010 and serves early childhood to 5th grade.

Athletics
 middle school grades participate in the Private School Interscholastic Association's events, while there is no athletic association for high school grades.

In 2004 Darul Arqam submitted an application to join the Texas Association of Private and Parochial Schools (TAPPS), a private school athletic association which includes several Christian private schools. Khaled Katbi, who represented the school, had a meeting with TAPPS on November 4, 2004, and did not report any unusual questions. However the school subsequently received a letter which included a questionnaire with "Why do you wish to join an organization whose membership is basically in total disagreement with your religious beliefs?" and "Why do you think that the current member schools of TAPPS will not be biased against your school, based on the fundamental difference in your religion and Christianity, since about 90% of TAPPS schools embrace Christianity?" In response the American Civil Liberties Union of Texas stated that TAPPS should be investigated.

See also

 Islam in Houston

References

External links
 Islamic Education Institute of Texas
 Darul Arqam Schools
 Everest Academy

Schools in Houston
Islam in Houston
Islamic schools in Texas
Private schools in Greater Houston
Private K-12 schools in Texas
Private K-12 schools in Houston
Private K-12 schools in Harris County, Texas